Montford Bridge is a village in Shropshire, England, and also the name of the bridge  in that village.

It lies on the River Severn and is close to the town of Shrewsbury. Most of the village is in the Montford parish, but some is covered by the Bicton parish.

The A5 road used to run through the village (over the Montford Bridge), but has been diverted via the Shrewsbury bypass. There are still some services, such as a shop (closed as of 2011) and a pub (the Wingfield Arms), in the village.

The bridge was Thomas Telford's first bridge design. It was built by John Carline and John Tilley between 1790 and 1792. It has three masonry elliptical arch spans, two of 55 ft, and the central one of 58 ft.

They are built of red sandstone obtained from Nesscliffe Hill four miles distant. The bridge cost £5,800 to build. Regarding the bridge, Telford wrote:
The contractors, Messrs. Carline and Tilley, being experienced workmen, it has proved a substantial edifice, having been completed upwards of forty years, and remaining quite perfect

It was widened in 1963 by adding a reinforced concrete slab. The bridge is now a Grade II listed building.

See also 
Listed buildings in Montford, Shropshire
Crossings of the River Severn

References

Bibliography 

Cragg, R., Civil Engineering Heritage - Wales & West Central England, Thomas Telford Publishing, 1997, 

Bridges in Shropshire
Bridges completed in 1792
Bridges across the River Severn
Grade II listed buildings in Shropshire
Villages in Shropshire
Bridges by Thomas Telford
Grade II listed bridges